John Keyes, son of Sampson Keyes, was the first Adjutant General of the State of Connecticut, being appointed to that position in 1782 and retiring from service in 1791.  He also served in the American Revolution in the Continental Army.

Military career
John Keyes was commissioned as a lieutenant in Knowlton's Rangers in 1776 by the unit's namesake, Colonel Thomas Knowlton.  Under Knowlton, he fought in the American Revolution.  He was present at the Battle of Harlem Heights, where Knowlton fell in battle.  Along with other members of the unit, Keyes was one of the first military intelligence operatives in the American Army, where he achieved the rank of captain.

After the war, Keyes was promoted to brigadier major and was appointed as the first adjutant general of the State of Connecticut the following year.  The position was officially established by Connecticut law in 1784, and he held the office until 1791.

Personal life
John Keyes married Mary Wales on September 28, 1767.  Mary was the daughter of Elisha and Mary (Abbe) Wales.  Together they had five children: Clarissa (1758–1846), Elnathan (1770–1853), Laura, Zachariah (1778–1834) and Almira (1785–1842).  After his military career, the family moved to Vermont and later Canajoharie, NY where he obtained a grant of land.  His wife, Mary, died on September 11, 1806, and John remarried on October 18, 1807, to Mercy Scott (1748–1860).  John died on April 13, 1824, in the State of New York.

References
 Abbe, Cleveland & Joseph Genung Nichols, Abbe-Abbey Genealogy In Memory of John Abbe and his Descendants, 1916
 Listings of Adjutants General - State of Connecticut
 Daughters of the American Revolution Library

1745 births
1824 deaths
People of colonial Connecticut
People from Ashford, Connecticut
Continental Army officers from Connecticut
United States Army Rangers
Military personnel from Connecticut